The 1924–25 Illinois Fighting Illini men's basketball team represented the University of Illinois.

Regular season
The 1924–25 season for Fighting Illini coach, Craig Ruby, had an identical record both overall as well as within the conference as the previous season. Both seasons finished with overall records of 11 wins and 6 losses with 8 wins and 4 losses within the conference. The 1924–25 Fighting Illini tied for third place within the conference. Huff Hall's construction was completed in 1925 and this season was the Illini's final full season in Kenney Gym. The starting lineup included captain John Mauer, Jack Lipe and Leonard Haines at guard, T.D. Karnes and Russell Daugherity at forward, with Hollie Martin at center.

Roster

Source

Schedule
												
Source																

|-	
!colspan=12 style="background:#DF4E38; color:white;"| Non-Conference regular season
|- align="center" bgcolor=""

			

|-	
!colspan=9 style="background:#DF4E38; color:#FFFFFF;"|Big Ten regular season

Bold Italic connotes conference game

Awards and honors

References

Illinois Fighting Illini
Illinois Fighting Illini men's basketball seasons
Illinois Fighting Illini men's basketball
Illinois Fighting Illini men's basketball